The Laurence Olivier Award for Best Theatre Choreographer is an annual award presented by the Society of London Theatre in recognition of achievements in commercial London theatre. The awards were established as the Society of West End Theatre Awards in 1976, and renamed in 1984 in honour of English actor and director Laurence Olivier.

This award was introduced in 1991.

Winners and nominees

1990s

2000s

2010s

2020s

Multiple awards and nominations for Best Theatre Choreographer

Awards
Five awards
Matthew Bourne

Three awards
Stephen Mear

Two awards
Peter Darling
Susan Stroman

Nominations
Ten nominations

Stephen Mear

Six nominations
Peter Darling

Five nominations
Matthew Bourne
Susan Stroman

Four nominations
Rob Ashford
Jerry Mitchell

Three nominations
Bill Deamer
Steven Hoggett
Anthony Van Laast

Two nominations
Javier de Frutos
Craig Revel Horwood
Bill T. Jones
Kathleen Marshall
Rob Marshall
Casey Nicholaw
Dein Perry
Arlene Philips
Ann Reinking
Andrew Wright

See also
 Drama Desk Award for Outstanding Choreography
 Tony Award for Best Choreography

References

External links
 

Theatre Choreographer